Sheraton Grand Kraków is a 5 stars hotel in Kraków, Poland. The hotel is located on the Wisla River bank, near the famous Wawel Castle, close is also the Market Square at the Old Town.

Restaurants and bars 
 The Olive Restaurant
 Qube Vodka Bar & Café
 SomePlace Else
 Roof Top Terrace & Lounge Bar

See also 
List of hotels in Poland

References 

Article contains translated text from Hotel Sheraton w Krakowie on the Polish Wikipedia retrieved on 1 April 2017.

External links 
Homepage

Hotels in Kraków
Hotels established in 2004
Hotel buildings completed in 2004
Buildings and structures in Kraków